Thiocolchicoside (Muscoril, Myoril, Neoflax) is a muscle relaxant with anti-inflammatory and analgesic effects. How it works is unknown, but it is believed to be via antagonism of nicotinic acetylcholine receptors. However, it is also appears to be a competitive antagonist of GABAA and glycine receptors. As such, it has powerful convulsant activity and should not be used in seizure-prone individuals.

Side effects 
Side effects of thiocolchicoside can include nausea, allergy and vasovagal reactions.
Liver injury, pancreatitis, seizures, blood cell disorders, severe cutaneous disorders, rhabdomyolysis, and reproductive disorders have all been recorded in the French and European pharmacovigilance databases and in the periodic updates that the companies concerned submit to regulatory agencies. These data do not specify the frequency of the disorders nor do they identify the most susceptible patient populations. Thiocolchicoside is teratogenic in experimental animals and also damages chromosomes. Human data are limited to a follow-up of about 30 pregnant women (no major malformations) and reports of altered spermatogenesis, including cases of azoospermia. In practice, there is no justification for exposing patients to the adverse effects of thiocolchicoside. It is better to use an effective, well-known analgesic for patients complaining of muscle pain, starting with paracetamol.

Although muscle relaxants may have the major side effect of sedation, thiocolchicoside is free from sedation effects, likely due to its lack of potentiation of GABAA receptors.

Pharmacokinetics
Thiocolchicoside is broken down in the body to a metabolite called 3-demethylthiocolchicine (also known as SL59.0955 or M2) that could damage dividing cells therefore inducing toxicity in the embryo, neoplastic changes and fertility reduction in males. Therefore, recommended oral dose should not exceed 7 days and intramuscular dose duration should not exceed 5 days. Local skin preparations are less toxic.

References 

Glucosides
Phenol ethers
Acetamides
Tropones
Heptalenes
Thioethers
Glycine receptor agonists
GABAA receptor agonists
Nicotinic antagonists
Convulsants